RMS Lusitania (named after the Roman province in Western Europe corresponding to modern Portugal) was a British ocean liner that was launched by the Cunard Line in 1906 and that held the Blue Riband appellation for the fastest Atlantic crossing in 1908. It was briefly the world's largest passenger ship until the completion of the  three months later.

The sinking occurred about two years before the United States declaration of war on Germany. Although the Lusitanias sinking was a major factor in building American support for a war, war was eventually declared only after the Imperial German Government resumed the use of unrestricted submarine warfare against American shipping in an attempt to break the Transatlantic supply chain from the US to Britain, as well as after the Zimmermann Telegram.

German shipping lines were Cunard's main competitors for the custom of Transatlantic passengers in the early 20th century, and Cunard responded by building two new 'ocean greyhounds': the Lusitania and the Mauretania. Cunard used assistance from the British Admiralty to build both new ships, on the understanding that the ship would be available for military duty in time of war. During construction gun mounts for deck cannons were installed but no guns were ever fitted. They were equipped with lifts, wireless telegraph, and electric light, and provided 50 percent more passenger space than any other ship; the first-class decks were known for their sumptuous furnishings.

The Royal Navy had blockaded Germany at the start of the First World War; the UK had declared the North Sea a war zone in the autumn of 1914 and mined the approaches. In the spring of 1915, all food imports for Germany were declared contraband. In response Germany had declared the seas around the United Kingdom a war zone too, and German submarine warfare was intensifying in the Atlantic. When RMS Lusitania left New York for Britain on 1 May 1915 the German embassy in the United States placed fifty newspaper advertisements warning people of the dangers of sailing on Lusitania. Objections were made by the British that threatening to torpedo all ships indiscriminately was wrong, whether it was announced in advance or not.

A second internal explosion caused her to sink in 18 minutes, killing 1,198 passengers and crew. The German government justified treating Lusitania as a naval vessel because she was carrying 173 tons of war munitions and ammunition, making her a legitimate military target, and they argued that British merchant ships had violated the cruiser rules from the very beginning of the war. The internationally recognised cruiser rules were obsolete by 1915; it had become more dangerous for submarines to surface and give warning with the introduction of Q-ships in 1915 by the Royal Navy, which were armed with concealed deck guns. The Germans argued that Lusitania was regularly transporting "war munitions"; she operated under the control of the Admiralty; she could be converted into an armed auxiliary cruiser to join the war; her identity had been disguised; and she flew no flags. They claimed that she was a non-neutral vessel in a declared war zone, with orders to evade capture and ram challenging submarines.

However, the ship was not armed for battle and was carrying hundreds of civilian passengers, and the British government accused the Germans of breaching the cruiser rules. The sinking caused a storm of protest in the United States because 128 American citizens were among the dead. The sinking shifted public opinion in the United States against Germany and was one of the factors in the declaration of war nearly two years later. After the First World War, successive British governments maintained that there were no munitions on board Lusitania, and the Germans were not justified in treating the ship as a naval vessel. In 1982, the head of the Foreign Office's American department finally admitted that there is a large amount of ammunition in the wreck, some of which is highly dangerous and poses a safety risk to salvage teams.

Development and construction

They had larger, faster, more modern and more luxurious ships than Cunard, and were better placed, starting from German ports, to capture the lucrative trade in emigrants leaving Europe for North America. The NDL liner  captured the Blue Riband from Cunard's  in 1897, before the prize was taken in 1900 by the HAPAG ship . Cunard saw its passenger numbers affected as a result of the so-called "s".

American millionaire businessman J. P. Morgan had decided to invest in transatlantic shipping by creating a new company, International Mercantile Marine (IMM), and, in 1901, purchased the British freight shipper Frederick Leyland & Co. and a controlling interest in the British passenger White Star Line and folded them into IMM. In 1902, IMM, NDL and HAPAG entered into a "Community of Interest" to fix prices and divide among them the transatlantic trade. The partners also acquired a 51% stake in the Dutch Holland America Line. IMM made offers to purchase Cunard which, along with the French Compagnie Générale Transatlantique (CGT), was now its principal rival.

Cunard chairman Lord Inverclyde thus approached the British government for assistance. Faced with the impending collapse of the British liner fleet and the consequent loss of national prestige, as well as the reserve of shipping for war purposes which it represented, they agreed to help. By an agreement signed in June 1903, Cunard was given a loan of £2.6 million to finance two ships, repayable over 20 years at a favourable interest rate of 2.75%. The ships would receive an annual operating subsidy of £75,000 each plus a mail contract worth £68,000. In return, the ships would be built to Admiralty specifications so that they could be used as auxiliary cruisers in wartime.

Design

Cunard established a committee to decide upon the design for the new ships, of which James Bain, Cunard's Marine Superintendent was the chairman. Other members included Rear Admiral H. J. Oram, who had been involved in designs for steam turbine-powered ships for the Royal Navy, and Charles Parsons, whose company Parsons Marine was now producing turbine engines.

Turbines offered the advantages of generating less vibration than the reciprocating engines and greater reliability in operation at high speeds, combined with lower fuel consumption. Having initially turned down the use of this relatively untried type of engine, Cunard was persuaded by the Admiralty to set up a committee of marine professionals to look at its possible use on the new liners. The relative merits of turbines and reciprocating engines were investigated in a series of trials between Newhaven and Dieppe using the turbine-driven cross-Channel ferry Brighton and the similarity-designed Arundel, which had reciprocating engines. The Turbine Committee was convinced by these and other tests that turbines were the way forward and recommended on 24 March 1904 that they should be used on the new express liners. Carmania was completed in 1905 and this gave Cunard almost two years of experience before the introduction of their new super liners in 1907.

The ship was designed by Leonard Peskett and built by John Brown and Company of Clydebank, Scotland. The ship's name was taken from Lusitania, an ancient Roman province on the west of the Iberian Peninsula—the region that is now southern Portugal and Extremadura (Spain). The name had also been used by a previous ship built in 1871 and wrecked in 1901, making the name available from Lloyd's for Cunard's giant.

Peskett had built a large model of the proposed ship in 1902 showing a three-funnel design. A fourth funnel was implemented into the design in 1904 as it was necessary to vent the exhaust from additional boilers fitted after steam turbines had been settled on as the power plant. The original plan called for three propellers, but this was altered to four because it was felt the necessary power could not be transmitted through just three. Four turbines would drive four separate propellers, with additional reversing turbines to drive the two inboard shafts only. To improve efficiency, the two inboard propellers rotated inward, while those outboard rotated outward. The outboard turbines operated at high pressure; the exhaust steam then passing to those inboard at relatively low pressure.

The propellers were driven directly by the turbines, for sufficiently robust gearboxes had not yet been developed, and became available in only 1916. Instead, the turbines had to be designed to run at a much lower speed than those normally accepted as being optimum. Thus, the efficiency of the turbines installed was less at low speeds than a conventional reciprocating steam engine, but significantly better when the engines were run at high speed, as was usually the case for an express liner. The ship was fitted with 23 double-ended and two single-ended boilers (which fitted the forward space where the ship narrowed), operating at a maximum  and containing 192 individual furnaces.

Work to refine the hull shape was conducted in the Admiralty experimental tank at Haslar, Gosport. The hull immediately in front of the rudder and the balanced rudder itself followed naval design practice to improve the vessel's turning response. The Admiralty contract required that all machinery be below the waterline, where it was considered to be better protected from gunfire, and the aft third of the ship below water was used to house the turbines, the steering motors and four  steam-driven turbo-generators. The central half contained four boiler rooms, with the remaining space at the forward end of the ship being reserved for cargo and other storage.

Coal bunkers were placed along the length of the ship outboard of the boiler rooms, with a large transverse bunker immediately in front of that most forward (number 1) boiler room. Apart from convenience ready for use, the coal was considered to provide added protection for the central spaces against attack. At the very front were the chain lockers for the huge anchor chains and ballast tanks to adjust the ship's trim.

The hull space was divided into thirteen watertight compartments, any two of which could be flooded without risk of the ship sinking, connected by 35 hydraulically operated watertight doors. A critical flaw in the arrangement of the watertight compartments was that sliding doors to the coal bunkers needed to be open to provide a constant feed of coal whilst the ship was operating, and closing these in emergency conditions could be problematic. The ship had a double bottom with the space between divided into separate watertight cells. The ship's exceptional height was due to the six decks of passenger accommodation above the waterline, compared to the customary four decks in existing liners.

High-tensile steel was used for the ship's plating, as opposed to the more conventional mild steel. This allowed a reduction in plate thickness, reducing weight but still providing 26 per cent greater strength than otherwise. Plates were held together by triple rows of rivets. The ship was heated and cooled throughout by a thermo-tank ventilation system, which used steam-driven heat exchangers to warm air to a constant , while steam was injected into the airflow to maintain steady humidity.

Forty-nine separate units driven by electric fans provided seven complete changes of air per hour throughout the ship, through an interconnected system, so that individual units could be switched off for maintenance. A separate system of exhaust fans removed air from galleys and bathrooms. As built, the ship conformed fully with Board of Trade safety regulations which required sixteen lifeboats with a capacity of approximately 1,000 people.

At the time of her completion, Lusitania was briefly the largest ship ever built, but was soon eclipsed by the slightly larger Mauretania which entered service shortly afterwards. She was  longer, a full  faster, and had a capacity of 10,000 gross register tons over and above that of the most modern German liner, . Passenger accommodation was 50% larger than any of her competitors, providing for 552 saloon class, 460 cabin class and 1,186 in third class. Her crew comprised 69 on deck, 369 operating engines and boilers and 389 to attend to passengers. Both she and Mauretania had a wireless telegraph, electric lighting, electric lifts, sumptuous interiors and an early form of air-conditioning.

Interiors

At the time of their introduction onto the North Atlantic, both Lusitania and Mauretania possessed among the most luxurious, spacious and comfortable interiors afloat. The Scottish architect James Miller was chosen to design Lusitanias interiors, while Harold Peto was chosen to design Mauretania. Miller chose to use plasterwork to create interiors whereas Peto made extensive use of wooden panelling, with the result that the overall impression given by Lusitania was brighter than Mauretania.

The ship's passenger accommodation was spread across six decks; from the top deck down to the waterline they were Boat Deck (A Deck), the Promenade Deck (B Deck), the Shelter Deck (C Deck), the Upper Deck (D Deck), the Main Deck (E Deck) and the Lower Deck (F Deck), with each of the three passenger classes being allotted their own space on the ship. As seen aboard all passenger liners of the era, first-, second- and third-class passengers were strictly segregated from one another. According to her original configuration in 1907, she was designed to carry 2,198 passengers and 827 crew members. The Cunard Line prided itself with a record for passenger satisfaction.

Lusitanias first-class accommodation was in the centre section of the ship on the five uppermost decks, mostly concentrated between the first and fourth funnels. When fully booked, Lusitania could cater to 552 first-class passengers. In common with all major liners of the period, Lusitanias first-class interiors were decorated with a mélange of historical styles. The lower floor measuring  could seat 323, with a further 147 on the  upper floor. The walls were finished with white and gilt carved mahogany panels, with Corinthian decorated columns which were required to support the floor above. The one concession to seaborne life was that furniture was bolted to the floor, meaning passengers could not rearrange their seating for their personal convenience.

All other first-class public rooms were situated on the boat deck and comprised a lounge, reading and writing room, smoking room and veranda café. The last was an innovation on a Cunard liner and, in warm weather, one side of the café could be opened up to give the impression of sitting outdoors. This would have been a rarely used feature given the often inclement weather of the North Atlantic.

The first-class lounge was decorated in Georgian style with inlaid mahogany panels surrounding a jade green carpet with a yellow floral pattern, measuring overall .

The design was linked overall with decorative plasterwork. The library walls were decorated with carved pilasters and mouldings marking out panels of grey and cream silk brocade. The carpet was rose, with Rose du Barry silk curtains and upholstery. The chairs and writing desks were mahogany, and the windows featured etched glass. The smoking room was Queen Anne style, with Italian walnut panelling and Italian red furnishings. The grand stairway linked all six decks of the passenger accommodation with wide hallways on each level and two lifts. First-class cabins ranged from one shared room through various ensuite arrangements in a choice of decorative styles culminating in the two regal suites which each had two bedrooms, dining room, parlour and bathroom. The port suite decoration was modelled on the Petit Trianon.

Lusitanias second-class accommodation was confined to the stern, behind the aft mast, where quarters for 460 second-class passengers were located. The second-class public rooms were situated on partitioned sections of boat and promenade decks housed in a separate section of the superstructure aft of the first-class passenger quarters. Design work was deputised to Robert Whyte, who was the architect employed by John Brown. Although smaller and plainer, the design of the dining room reflected that of first class, with just one floor of diners under a ceiling with a smaller dome and balcony. Walls were panelled and carved with decorated pillars, all in white. As seen in first class, the dining room was situated lower down in the ship on the saloon deck. The smoking and ladies' rooms occupied the accommodation space of the second-class promenade deck, with the lounge on the boat deck.

Cunard had not previously provided a separate lounge for second class; the  room had mahogany tables, chairs and settees set on a rose carpet. One wall had a mosaic of a river scene in Brittany, while the sliding windows were blue-tinted. Second-class passengers were allotted shared, yet comfortable two- and four-berth cabins arranged on the shelter, upper and main decks.

Noted as being the prime breadwinner for trans-Atlantic shipping lines, third class aboard Lusitania was praised for the improvement in travel conditions it provided to emigrant passengers; Lusitania proved to be a quite popular ship for immigrants. In the days before Lusitania and even still during the years in which Lusitania was in service, third-class accommodation consisted of large open spaces where hundreds of people would share open berths and hastily constructed public spaces, often consisting of no more than a small portion of open deck space and a few tables constructed within their sleeping quarters. In an attempt to break that mould, the Cunard Line began designing ships such as Lusitania with more comfortable third-class accommodation.

As on all Cunard passenger liners, third-class accommodation aboard Lusitania was located at the forward end of the ship on the shelter, upper, main and lower decks, and in comparison to other ships of the period, it was comfortable and spacious. The  dining room was at the bow of the ship on the saloon deck, finished in polished pine as were the other two third-class public rooms, being the smoke room and ladies room on the shelter deck.

When Lusitania was fully booked in third class, the smoking and ladies room could easily be converted into overflow dining rooms for added convenience. Meals were eaten at long tables with swivel chairs and there were two sittings for meals. A piano was provided for passenger use. What greatly appealed to immigrants and lower class travellers was that instead of being confined to open berth dormitories, aboard Lusitania was a honeycomb of two, four, six and eight berth cabins allotted to third-class passengers on the main and lower decks.

The Bromsgrove Guild had designed and constructed most of the trim on Lusitania. Waring and Gillow tendered for the contract to furnish the whole ship, but failing to obtain this still supplied a number of the furnishings.

Construction and trials

Lusitanias keel was laid at John Brown on Clydebank as yard no. 367 on 17 August 1904, Lord Inverclyde hammering home the first rivet. Cunard nicknamed her 'the Scottish ship' in contrast to Mauretania whose contract went to Swan Hunter in England and who started building three months later. Final details of the two ships were left to designers at the two yards so that the ships differed in details of hull design and finished structure. The ships may most readily be distinguished in photographs through the flat-topped ventilators used on Lusitania, whereas those on Mauretania used a more conventional rounded top. Mauretania was designed a little longer, wider, heavier and with an extra power stage fitted to the turbines.

The new slipway took up the space of two existing ones and was built on reinforcing piles driven deeply into the ground to ensure it could take the temporary concentrated weight of the whole ship as it slid into the water. In addition, the company spent £8,000 to dredge the Clyde, £6,500 on new gas plant, £6,500 on a new electrical plant, £18,000 to extend the dock and £19,000 for a new crane capable of lifting 150 tons as well as £20,000 on additional machinery and equipment.
Construction commenced at the bow working backwards, rather than the traditional approach of building both ends towards the middle. This was because designs for the stern and engine layout were not finalised when construction commenced. Railway tracks were laid alongside the ship and across deck plating to bring materials as required. The hull, completed to the level of the main deck but not fitted with equipment weighed approximately 16,000 tons.

The ship's stockless bower anchors weighed 10 tons, attached to 125 ton, 330 fathom chains all manufactured by N. Hingley & Sons Ltd.  The steam capstans to raise them were constructed by Napier Brothers Ltd, of Glasgow. The rotors were constructed on site, while the casings and shafting were constructed in John Brown's Atlas works in Sheffield. The machinery to drive the 56-ton rudder was constructed by Brown Brothers of Edinburgh. A main steering engine drove the rudder through worm gear and clutch operating on a toothed quadrant rack, with a reserve engine operating separately on the rack via a chain drive for emergency use. The  three-bladed propellers were fitted and then cased in wood to protect them during the launch.

The ship was launched on 7 June 1906, eight weeks later than planned due to labour strikes and eight months after Lord Inverclyde's death. Princess Louise was invited to name the ship but could not attend, so the honour fell to Inverclyde's widow Mary. The launch was attended by 600 invited guests and thousands of spectators. One thousand tons of drag chains were attached to the hull by temporary rings to slow it once it entered the water. The wooden supporting structure was held back by cables so that once the ship entered the water it would slip forward out of its support. Six tugs were on hand to capture the hull and move it to the fitting out berth.
Testing of the ship's engines took place in June 1907 prior to full trials scheduled for July. A preliminary cruise, or Builder's Trial, was arranged for 27 July with representatives of Cunard, the Admiralty, the Board of Trade, and John Brown aboard. At high speeds the ship was found to suffer such vibration at the stern as to render the second-class accommodation uninhabitable. VIP invited guests now came on board for a two-day shakedown cruise during which the ship was tested under continuous running at speeds of 15, 18 and 21 knots but not her maximum speed. On 29 July, the guests departed and three days of full trials commenced. The ship travelled four times between the Corsewall Light off Scotland to the Longship Light off Cornwall at 23 and 25 knots, between the Corsewall Light and the Isle of Man, and the Isle of Arran and Ailsa Craig. Over  an average speed of 25.4 knots was achieved, comfortably greater than the 24 knots required under the Admiralty contract. The ship could stop in 4 minutes in 3/4 of a mile starting from 23 knots at 166 rpm and then applying full reverse. At 180 revolutions a turning test was conducted and the ship performed a complete circle of diameter 1000 yards in 50 seconds. The rudder required 20 seconds to be turned hard to 35 degrees.

The vibration was determined to be caused by interference between the wake of the outer propellers and inner and became worse when turning. At high speeds the vibration frequency resonated with the ship's stern making the matter worse. The solution was to add internal stiffening to the stern of the ship but this necessitated gutting the second-class areas and then rebuilding them. This required the addition of a number of pillars and arches to the decorative scheme. The ship was finally delivered to Cunard on 26 August although the problem of vibration was never entirely solved and further remedial work went on throughout her life.

Comparison with the Olympic class
The White Star Line's  vessels were almost  longer and slightly wider than Lusitania and Mauretania. This made the White Star vessels about 15,000 tons larger than the Cunard vessels. Both Lusitania and Mauretania were launched and had been in service for several years before Olympic,  and Britannic were ready for the North Atlantic run. Although significantly faster than the Olympic class would be, the speed of Cunard's vessels was not sufficient to allow the line to run a weekly two-ship transatlantic service from each side of the Atlantic. A third ship was needed for a weekly service, and in response to White Star's announced plan to build the three Olympic-class ships, Cunard ordered a third ship: . Like , Cunard's Aquitania had a lower service speed, but was a larger and more luxurious vessel.

Due to their increased size the Olympic-class liners could offer many more amenities than Lusitania and Mauretania. Both Olympic and Titanic offered swimming pools, Turkish baths, a gymnasium, a squash court, large reception rooms, À la Carte restaurants separate from the dining saloons, and many more staterooms with private bathroom facilities than their two Cunard rivals.

Heavy vibrations as a by-product of the four steam turbines on Lusitania and Mauretania would plague both ships throughout their voyages. When Lusitania sailed at top speed the resultant vibrations were so severe that second- and third-class sections of the ship could become uninhabitable. In contrast, the Olympic-class liners used two traditional reciprocating engines and only one turbine for the central propeller, which greatly reduced vibration. Because of their greater tonnage and wider beam, the Olympic-class liners were also more stable at sea and less prone to rolling. Lusitania and Mauretania both featured straight prows in contrast to the angled prows of the Olympic class. Designed so that the ships could plunge through a wave rather than crest it, the unforeseen consequence was that the Cunard liners would pitch forward alarmingly, even in calm weather, allowing huge waves to splash the bow and forward part of the superstructure. This would be a major factor in damage that Lusitania suffered at the hands of a rogue wave in January 1910.

The vessels of the Olympic class also differed from Lusitania and Mauretania in the way in which they were compartmented below the waterline. The White Star vessels were divided by transverse watertight bulkheads. While Lusitania also had transverse bulkheads, it also had longitudinal bulkheads running along the ship on each side, between the boiler and engine rooms and the coal bunkers on the outside of the vessel. The British commission that had investigated the sinking of Titanic in 1912 heard testimony on the flooding of coal bunkers lying outside longitudinal bulkheads. Being of considerable length, when flooded, these could increase the ship's list and "make the lowering of the boats on the other side impracticable"—and this was precisely what later happened with Lusitania. The ship's stability was insufficient for the bulkhead arrangement used: flooding of only three coal bunkers on one side could result in negative metacentric height. On the other hand, Titanic was given ample stability and sank with only a few degrees list, the design being such that there was very little risk of unequal flooding and possible capsize.

Lusitania did not carry enough lifeboats for all her passengers, officers and crew on board at the time of her maiden voyage (carrying four lifeboats fewer than Titanic would carry in 1912). This was a common practice for large passenger ships at the time, since the belief was that in busy shipping lanes help would always be nearby and the few boats available would be adequate to ferry all aboard to rescue ships before a sinking. After the Titanic sank, Lusitania and Mauretania were equipped with an additional six clinker-built wooden boats under davits, making for a total of 22 boats rigged in davits. The rest of their lifeboat accommodations were supplemented with 26 collapsible lifeboats, 18 stored directly beneath the regular lifeboats and eight on the after deck. The collapsibles were built with hollow wooden bottoms and canvas sides, and needed assembly in the event they had to be used.

This difference would have been a major contributor to the high loss of life involved with Lusitanias sinking, since there was not sufficient time to assemble collapsible boats or life-rafts, had it not been for the fact that the ship's severe listing made it impossible for lifeboats on the port side of the vessel to be lowered, and the rapidity of the sinking did not allow the remaining lifeboats that could be directly lowered (as these were rigged under davits) to be filled and launched with passengers. When Britannic, working as a hospital ship during World War I, sank in 1916 after hitting a mine in the Kea Channel the already davited boats were swiftly lowered saving nearly all on board, but the ship took nearly three times as long to sink as Lusitania and thus the crew had more time to evacuate passengers.

Career

Lusitania, commanded by Commodore James Watt, moored at the Liverpool landing stage for her maiden voyage at 4:30 pm on Saturday 7 September 1907 as the onetime Blue Riband holder  vacated the pier. At the time Lusitania was the largest ocean liner in service and would continue to be until the introduction of Mauretania in November that year. A crowd of 200,000 people gathered to see her departure at 9:00 pm for Queenstown (renamed Cobh in 1920), where she was to take on more passengers. She anchored again at Roche's Point, off Queenstown, at 9:20 am the following morning, where she was shortly joined by Lucania, which she had passed in the night, and 120 passengers were brought out to the ship by tender bringing her total of passengers to 2,320.

At 12:10 pm on Sunday Lusitania was again under way and passing the Daunt Rock Lightship. Fog had delayed the ship on two days, and her engines were not yet run in. In New York hundreds of thousands of people gathered on the bank of the Hudson River from Battery Park to pier 56. All New York's police had been called out to control the crowd. From the start of the day, 100 horse-drawn cabs had been queuing, ready to take away passengers. During the week's stay the ship was made available for guided tours. At 3 pm on Saturday 21 September, the ship departed on the return journey, arriving Queenstown 4 am 27 September and Liverpool 12 hours later. The return journey was 5 days 4 hours and 19 minutes, again delayed by fog.

On her second voyage in better weather, Lusitania arrived at Sandy Hook on 11 October 1907 in the Blue Riband record time of 4 days, 19 hours and 53 minutes. She had to wait for the tide to enter harbour where news had preceded her and she was met by a fleet of small craft, whistles blaring. Lusitania averaged  westbound and  eastbound. In December 1907, Mauretania entered service and took the record for the fastest eastbound crossing. Lusitania made her fastest westbound crossing in 1909 after her propellers were changed, averaging . During her eight-year service, she made a total of 201 crossings on the Cunard Line's Liverpool-New York Route, carrying a total of 155,795 passengers westbound and another 106,180 eastbound.

Hudson Fulton Celebration

Lusitania and other ships participated in the Hudson-Fulton Celebration in New York City from the end of September to early October 1909. The celebration was also a display of the different modes of transportation then in existence, Lusitania representing the newest advancement in steamship technology. A newer mode of travel was the aeroplane. Wilbur Wright had brought a Flyer to Governors Island and made demonstration flights before millions of New Yorkers who had never seen an aircraft. Some of Wright's trips were directly over Lusitania; several photographs of Lusitania from that week still exist.

Rogue wave crash
The design of the ship's bow allowed for her to break through waves instead of riding on top of them. This, however, came with a cost, as the wave rolled over Lusitania'''s bow and slammed into the bridge. As a result, the forecastle deck was damaged, the bridge windows were smashed, the bridge was shifted a couple of inches aft, and both the deck and the bridge were given a permanent depression of a few inches. No one was injured, and the Lusitania continued on as normal, albeit arriving a few hours late in New York with some shaken-up passengers.

Outbreak of the First World War
When Lusitania was built, her construction and operating expenses were subsidised by the British government, with the proviso that she could be converted to an armed merchant cruiser (AMC) if need be. A secret compartment was designed in for the purpose of carrying arms and ammunition. When war was declared she was requisitioned by the British Admiralty as an armed merchant cruiser, and she was put on the official list of AMCs. Lusitania remained on the official AMC list and was listed as an auxiliary cruiser in the 1914 edition of Jane's All the World's Fighting Ships, along with Mauretania.

The 1856 Declaration of Paris codified the rules for naval engagements involving civilian vessels. The so-called Cruiser Rules required that the crew and passengers of civilian ships be safeguarded in the event that the ship is to be confiscated or sunk. These rules also placed some onus on the ship itself, in that the merchant ship had to be flying its own flag, and not pretending to be of a different nationality. Also, it had to stop when confronted and allow itself to be boarded and searched, and it was not allowed to be armed or to take any hostile or evasive actions. When war was declared, British merchant ships were given orders to ram submarines that surfaced to issue the warnings required by the Cruiser Rules.

At the outbreak of hostilities, fears for the safety of Lusitania and other great liners ran high. During the ship's first east-bound crossing after the war started, she was painted in a grey colour scheme in an attempt to mask her identity and make her more difficult to detect visually.

Many of the large liners were laid up in 1914–1915, in part due to falling demand for passenger travel across the Atlantic, and in part to protect them from damage due to mines or other dangers. Among the most recognisable of these liners, some were eventually used as troop transports, while others became hospital ships. Lusitania remained in commercial service; although bookings aboard her were by no means strong during that autumn and winter, demand was strong enough to keep her in civilian service. Economising measures were taken. With apparent dangers evaporating, the ship's disguised paint scheme was also dropped and she was returned to civilian colours. Her name was picked out in gilt, her funnels were repainted in their normal Cunard livery, and her superstructure was painted white again. One alteration was the addition of a bronze/gold-coloured band around the base of the superstructure just above the black paint.

1915

By early 1915, a new threat began to materialise: submarines. At first, they were used by the Germans only to attack naval vessels, something they achieved only occasionally but sometimes with spectacular success. Then the U-boats began to attack merchant vessels at times, although almost always in accordance with the old Cruiser Rules. Desperate to gain an advantage on the Atlantic, the German government decided to step up their submarine campaign, as a result of the British declaring the North Sea a war zone in November 1914. On 4 February 1915, Germany declared the seas around Great Britain and Ireland a war zone: from 18 February Allied ships in the area would be sunk without warning. This was not wholly unrestricted submarine warfare as efforts would be taken to avoid sinking neutral ships.Lusitania was scheduled to arrive in Liverpool on 6 March 1915. The Admiralty issued her specific instructions on how to avoid submarines. Admiral Henry Oliver ordered HMS Louis and HMS Laverock to escort Lusitania, and took the further precaution of sending the Q-ship HMS Lyons to patrol Liverpool Bay. The destroyer commander attempted to discover the whereabouts of Lusitania by telephoning Cunard, who refused to give out any information and referred him to the Admiralty. At sea, the ships contacted Lusitania by radio but did not have the codes used to communicate with merchant ships. Captain Dow of Lusitania refused to give his own position except in code, and since he was, in any case, some distance from the positions they gave, continued to Liverpool unescorted.

In response to this new submarine threat, some alterations were made to the ship's protocols. In contravention to the Cruiser Rules she was ordered not to fly any flags in the war zone. Some messages were sent to the ship's commander to help him decide how to best protect his ship against the new threat, and it also seems that her funnels were most likely painted dark grey to help make her less visible to enemy submarines. Clearly, there was no hope of disguising her identity, as her profile was so well known, and no attempt was made to paint out the ship's name at the bow.

Captain Dow, apparently suffering from stress from operating his ship in the war zone, and after a significant "false flag" controversy, left the ship; Cunard later explained that he was "tired and really ill". He was replaced by Captain William Thomas Turner, who had previously commanded Lusitania, Mauretania, and Aquitania in the years before the war.

On 17 April 1915, Lusitania left Liverpool on her 201st transatlantic voyage, arriving in New York on 24 April. A group of German-Americans, hoping to avoid controversy if Lusitania was attacked by a U-boat, discussed their concerns with a representative of the German Embassy. The embassy decided to warn passengers before her next crossing not to sail aboard Lusitania. The Imperial German Embassy placed a warning advertisement in 50 American newspapers, including those in New York:

This warning was printed adjacent to an advertisement for Lusitanias return voyage which led to many interpreting this as a direct message to the Lusitania. The ship departed Pier 54 in New York, on 1 May 1915 at 12:20 pm, on what would be her final voyage. A few hours after the vessel's departure, the Saturday evening edition of The Washington Times published two articles on its front page, both referring to those warnings.

Sinking

On 7 May 1915, Lusitania was nearing the end of her 202nd crossing, bound for Liverpool from New York, and was scheduled to dock at the Prince's Landing Stage later that afternoon. Aboard her were 1,266 passengers and a crew of 696, which combined totalled 1,962 people. Due to the liner's great speed, some believe the intersection of the German U-boat and the liner to be coincidence, as U-20 could hardly have caught the fast vessel otherwise. There are discrepancies concerning the speed of Lusitania, as it had been reported travelling not near its full speed. Walther Schwieger, the commanding officer of the U-boat, gave the order to fire one torpedo, which struck Lusitania on the starboard bow, just beneath the wheelhouse. Moments later, a second explosion erupted from within Lusitanias hull where the torpedo had struck, and the ship began to founder much more rapidly, with a prominent list to starboard.

Almost immediately, the crew scrambled to launch the lifeboats but the conditions of the sinking made their usage extremely difficult, and in some cases impossible due to the ship's severe list. In all, only 6 out of 48 lifeboats were launched successfully, with several more overturning and breaking apart. Eighteen minutes after the torpedo struck, the ship's trim levelled out and she went under, with the funnels and masts the last to disappear. Of the 1,962 passengers and crew aboard Lusitania at the time of the sinking, 1,198 lost their lives. In the hours after the sinking, acts of heroism amongst both the survivors of the sinking and the Irish rescuers who had heard word of Lusitanias distress signals brought the survivor count to 764, three of whom later died from injuries sustained during the sinking.

A British cruiser , which had heard of the sinking only a short time after Lusitania was struck, left her anchorage in Cork Harbour to render assistance. Just south of Roche's Point at the mouth of the harbour only an hour from the site of the sinking she turned and returned to her mooring as a result, it is believed, of orders issued from Admiralty House in Cobh (HQ Haulbowline naval base) by Admiral Charles Henry Coke. By the following morning, news of the disaster had spread around the world. While most of those lost in the sinking were British or Canadians, the loss of 128 Americans in the disaster, including writer and publisher Elbert Hubbard, theatrical producer Charles Frohman, multi-millionaire businessman Alfred Gwynne Vanderbilt, and the president of Newport News Shipbuilding, Albert L. Hopkins, outraged many in the United States.

In 1921, Cunard replaced the  Lusitania with the RMS Berengaria, which served until 1938.

Aftermath

The sinking caused an international outcry, especially in Britain and across the British Empire, as well as in the United States, since 128 out of 139 U.S. citizens aboard the ship lost their lives. On 8 May, Bernhard Dernburg, a German spokesman and a former German Colonial Secretary, published a statement in which he said that because Lusitania "carried contraband of war" and also because she "was classed as an auxiliary cruiser," Germany had a right to destroy her regardless of any passengers aboard. Dernburg claimed warnings given by the German Embassy before the sailing plus the 18 February note declaring the existence of "war zones" relieved Germany of any responsibility for the deaths of American citizens aboard. He referred to the ammunition and military goods declared on Lusitanias manifest and said that "vessels of that kind" could be seized and destroyed under the Hague Rules.

Grand Admiral Alfred von Tirpitz stated it was sad that many Americans "in wanton recklessness, and in spite of the warnings of our Ambassador, had embarked in this armed cruiser, heavily laden with munitions" and had died, but that Germany had been within her rights to sink the ship.Lusitania was indeed officially listed as an auxiliary war ship, though contrary to Tirpitz's assertion she was not armed, and her cargo had included an estimated 4,200,000 rounds of rifle cartridges, 1,250 empty shell cases, and 18 cases of non-explosive fuzes, which was openly listed as such in her cargo manifest. The day after the sinking, The New York Times published full details of the ship's military cargo. Assistant Manager of the Cunard Line, Herman Winter, denied the charge that she carried munitions, but admitted that she was carrying small-arms ammunition, and that she had been carrying such ammunition for years. The fact that Lusitania had been carrying shells and cartridges was not made known to the British public at the time.

In the 27-page additional manifest, delivered to U.S. customs 4–5 days after Lusitania sailed from New York, and in the Bethlehem Steels papers, it is stated that the "empty shells" were in fact 1,248 boxes of filled 3" shell, 4 shells to the box, totalling 103,000 pounds or 50 tonnes.

In the United States, public opinion was outraged; war talk was rife and pro-German elements kept quiet. The key issue was the savagery in the German failure to allow passengers to escape on life boats as required by international law. President Woodrow Wilson refused to immediately declare war—his main goal was to negotiate an end to the war. During the weeks after the sinking, the issue was hotly debated within the U.S. government, and correspondence was exchanged between the U.S. and German governments. German Foreign Minister Von Jagow continued to argue that Lusitania was a legitimate military target, as she was listed as an armed merchant cruiser, she was using neutral flags and she had been ordered to ram submarines—in blatant contravention of the Cruiser Rules.

Von Jagow further argued that Lusitania had on previous voyages carried munitions and Allied troops. Wilson continued to insist the German government apologise for the sinking, compensate U.S. victims, and promise to avoid any similar occurrence in the future. The British were disappointed with Wilson over his failure to pursue more drastic actions. Secretary of State William Jennings Bryan advised President Wilson that "ships carrying contraband should be prohibited from carrying passengers ... [I]t would be like putting women and children in front of an army." Bryan later resigned because he felt the Wilson administration was being biased in ignoring British contraventions of international law, and that Wilson was leading the U.S. into the war.

A German decision on 9 September 1915 stated that attacks were only allowed on ships that were definitely British, while neutral ships were to be treated under the Prize Law rules, and no attacks on passenger liners were to be permitted at all. A fabricated story was circulated that in some regions of Germany, schoolchildren were given a holiday to celebrate the sinking of Lusitania. This claim was so effective that James W. Gerard, the U.S. ambassador to Germany, recounted it in his memoir of his time in Germany, Face to Face with Kaiserism (1918), though without substantiating its validity.

Almost two years later, in January 1917, the German Government announced it would again conduct full unrestricted submarine warfare. This together with the Zimmermann Telegram pushed U.S. public opinion over the tipping point, and on 6 April 1917 the United States Congress followed President Wilson's request to declare war on Germany.

In 2014 a release of papers revealed that in 1982 the British government warned divers of the presence of explosives on board:

100th commemoration

On 3 May 2015, a flotilla set sail from the Isle of Man to mark the commemoration. Seven Manx fishermen in The Wanderer had rescued 150 people from the sinking ship. Two of the bravery medals awarded to the crew members are held at the Leece Museum in Peel.

7 May 2015 was the 100th commemoration of the sinking of Lusitania. To commemorate the occasion, Cunard's  undertook a voyage to Cork, Ireland.

Controversies
There are a number of controversies and conspiracy theories relating to the last days of Lusitania.

British Government deliberately putting Lusitania at risk
There has long been a theory, expressed by historian and former British naval intelligence officer Patrick Beesly and authors Colin Simpson and Donald E. Schmidt among others, that Lusitania was deliberately placed in danger by the British authorities, so as to entice a U-boat attack and thereby drag the US into the war on the side of Britain. A week before the sinking of Lusitania, Winston Churchill wrote to Walter Runciman, the President of the Board of Trade, stating that it is "most important to attract neutral shipping to our shores, in the hope especially of embroiling the United States with Germany."

Beesly concludes: "unless and until fresh information comes to light, I am reluctantly driven to the conclusion that there was a conspiracy deliberately to put Lusitania at risk in the hope that even an abortive attack on her would bring the United States into the war. Such a conspiracy could not have been put into effect without Winston Churchill's express permission and approval."

At the post-sinking inquiry, Captain Turner refused to answer certain questions on the grounds of war-time secrecy imperatives. The British government continues to keep secret certain documents relating to the final days of the voyage, including certain of the signals passed between the Admiralty and Lusitania. The records that are available are often missing critical pages, and lingering questions include the following:
 Were the British authorities aware (thanks to the secret decryption activities of Room 40) that a German submarine was in the path of Lusitania, but failed to divert the ship to a safer route?
 Did they also fail to provide a destroyer escort, although destroyers were available in a nearby port?
 Was the ship ordered to reduce speed in the war zone, for reasons that have been kept secret ever since?
 How did such a big ship sink so quickly from a single torpedo strike?

Undeclared war munitionsLusitania was officially carrying among her cargo 750 tons of rifle/machine-gun ammunition, 1250 cases of shrapnel artillery shells with the explosive burster charges loaded but no fuzes or propellant charges, and the artillery fuzes for those shells stored separately. In September 2008, .303 cartridges of a type known to be used by the British military were recovered from the wreck by diver Eoin McGarry. Beesly has stated that the cargo also included 46 tons of aluminium powder, which was used in the manufacture of explosives and which was being shipped to the Woolwich Arsenal, while Erik Larson has stated that the cargo included 50 barrels and 94 cases of aluminium powder, as well as 50 cases of bronze powder. Author Steven L. Danver states that Lusitania was also secretly carrying a large quantity of nitrocellulose (gun cotton), although this was not listed on the cargo manifest either.

Furthermore, there was a large consignment of fur, sent from Dupont de Nemours, an explosives manufacturer, and 90 tons of butter and lard destined for the Royal Navy Weapons Testing Establishment in Essex. Although it was May, this lard and butter was not refrigerated; it was insured by the special government rate but the insurance was never claimed.

Bombardment / destruction of the wreck
The wreck was depth-charged or attacked with Hedgehog mortars by the Royal Navy during World War II. A Dublin-based technical diver, Des Quigley, who dived on the wreck in the 1990s, reported that the wreck is "like Swiss cheese" and the seabed around her "is littered with unexploded hedgehog mines". These attacks may have been accidental as the wreck would have registered on World War Two active sonar (then known as ASDIC) as a possible U-boat. WW2 systems were not as discriminating as modern sonar. The wreck would have presented a good return signal and, thus, a tempting target. U-boats were so active in the Southern Irish Sea in WW2 that Britain eventually placed several deep minefields in the area—at depths where only submarines would have been liable to detonate them.

In February 2009, the Discovery Channel television series Treasure Quest aired an episode titled "Lusitania Revealed", in which Gregg Bemis, a retired venture capitalist who owns the rights to the wreck, and a team of shipwreck experts explore the wreck via a remote control unmanned submersible. At one point in the documentary an unexploded depth charge was found in the wreckage.

Professor William Kingston of Trinity College, Dublin claimed, "There's no doubt at all about it that the Royal Navy and the British government have taken very considerable steps over the years to try to prevent whatever can be found out about the Lusitania".

Wreck

The wreck is badly collapsed onto its starboard side, due to the force with which it struck the bottom coupled with the forces of winter tides and corrosion in the decades since the sinking. The keel has an "unusual curvature" which may be related to a lack of strength from the loss of its superstructure. The beam is reduced with the funnels missing—presumably due to deterioration.

The bow is the most prominent portion of the wreck with the stern damaged by depth charges. Three of the four propellers were removed by Oceaneering International in 1982 for display though one was melted down. When contrasted with her contemporary, Titanic (resting at a depth of ), Lusitania appears in a much more deteriorated state due to the presence of fishing nets lying on the wreckage, the blasting of the wreck with depth charges and multiple salvage operations. As a result, the wreck is unstable and may at some point completely collapse. There has been recent academic commentary exploring the possibility of listing the wreck site as a World Heritage Site under the World Heritage Convention, although challenges remain in terms of ownership and preventing further deterioration of the wreck.

Simon Lake's attempt to salvage in the 1930s
Between 1931 and 1935, an American syndicate comprising Simon Lake, an important submarine inventor, and a US Navy officer, Captain H.H. Railey, negotiated a contract with the British Admiralty and other British authorities to partially salvage Lusitania. The means of salvage was unique in that a  steel tube, five feet in diameter, which enclosed stairs, and a dive chamber at the bottom would be floated out over the Lusitania wreck and then sunk upright, with the dive chamber resting on the main deck of Lusitania. Divers would then take the stairs down to the dive chamber and then go out of the chamber to the deck of Lusitania. Lake's primary business goals were to salvage the purser's safe and any items of historical value. It was not to be though, and in Simon Lake's own words, "... but my hands were too full"—i.e. Lake's company was having financial difficulties at the time—and the contract with British authorities expired 31 December 1935 without any salvage work being done, even though his unique salvage tunnel had been built and tested.

 Argonaut expedition, 1935 

In 1935 a Glasgow-based expedition was launched to try and find the wreck of Lusitania. The Argonaut Corporation Ltd was founded and the salvage ship Orphir used to search for the ship. After three months of searching the wreck was discovered on 6 October 1935. Diver Jim Jarrett wore a Tritonia diving suit to explore the wreck at a depth of 93 metres.

Gregg Bemis's salvage efforts
In 1967, the wreck of Lusitania was sold by the Liverpool & London War Risks Insurance Association to former US Navy diver John Light (1932–1992) for £1,000. Gregg Bemis (1928–2020) became a co-owner of the wreck in 1968, and by 1982 had bought out his partners to become sole owner. He subsequently went to court in Britain in 1986, the US in 1995 and Ireland in 1996 to ensure that his ownership was legally in force.

None of the jurisdictions involved objected to his ownership of the vessel but in 1995 the Irish Government declared it a heritage site under the National Monuments Act, which prohibited him from in any way interfering with her or her contents. After a protracted legal wrangle, the Supreme Court in Dublin overturned the Arts and Heritage Ministry's previous refusal to issue Bemis with a five-year exploration licence in 2007, ruling that the then minister for Arts and Heritage had misconstrued the law when he refused Bemis's 2001 application. Bemis planned to dive and recover and analyse whatever artefacts and evidence could help piece together the story of what happened to the ship. He said that any items found would be given to museums following analysis. Any fine art recovered, such as the paintings by Rubens, Rembrandt and Monet among other artists believed to have been in the possession of Sir Hugh Lane, who was believed to be carrying them in lead tubes, would remain in the ownership of the Irish Government.

In late July 2008, Bemis was granted an "imaging" licence by the Department of the Environment, which allowed him to photograph and film the entire wreck, and was to allow him to produce the first high-resolution pictures of her. Bemis planned to use the data gathered to assess how fast the wreck was deteriorating and to plan a strategy for a forensic examination of the ship, which he estimated would cost $5m. Florida-based Odyssey Marine Exploration (OME) was contracted by Bemis to conduct the survey. The Department of the Environment's Underwater Archaeology Unit was to join the survey team to ensure that research would be carried out in a non-invasive manner, and a film crew from the Discovery Channel was also to be on hand.

A dive team from Cork Sub Aqua Club, diving under licence, discovered 15,000 rounds of the .303 (7.7×56mmR) calibre rifle ammunition transported on Lusitania in boxes in the bow section of the ship. The find was photographed but left in situ under the terms of the licence. In December 2008, Bemis's dive team estimated a further four million rounds of .303 ammunition were on the ship at the time of its sinking. Bemis announced plans to commission further dives in 2009 for a full-scale forensic examination of the wreck.

A salvage dive in July 2016 recovered, then lost, a telegraph machine from the ship. This caused controversy, because the dive was unsupervised by anyone with archaeological expertise and because the telegraph was thought to have clues to the ship's sinking.

The joint American-German TV production, Sinking of the Lusitania: Terror at Sea premiered on the Discovery Channel on 13 May 2007, and on BBC One in the UK on 27 May 2007.  In November 2018, Bemis was interviewed for one hour on live radio about the Lusitania, revealing previously unknown information about her sinking, including inter alia that many depth charges have been found at the wreckage site, that at least one has been brought to the surface, that some of the original art presumed to be lost in wreckage may not have been, and that additional evidence Churchill may have acted to provoke Germany into attacking the Lusitania has been overlooked.  He also talked about some of the logistical complications in conducting a maritime archaeological expedition to penetrate the hull.

Diving accidents
A number of technical divers attempting to dive at the Lusitania wreckage site have been seriously injured.  Mixed gases must be used to reach the wreckage which purportedly is littered with British depth charges and hedgehog mines, covered in fishing nets, stocked with WWI munitions, and where sediment limits visibility.

1984 British legal action
In 1982, various items were recovered from the wreck and brought ashore in the United Kingdom from the cargo of Lusitania. Complex litigation ensued, with all parties settling their differences apart from the salvors and the British Government, which asserted "droits of admiralty" over the recovered items. The judge eventually ruled in The Lusitania, [1986] QB 384, [1986] 1 All ER 1011, that the Crown has no rights over wrecks outside British territorial waters, even if the recovered items are subsequently brought into the United Kingdom. As of 1998, the case remained the leading authority on this point of law today.

Cultural significance

See also

 Avis Dolphin, a survivor
 Ian Holbourn, a survivor
 Charles T. Jeffery, a survivor
 Theodate Pope Riddle, a survivor
 List by death toll of ships sunk by submarines
 The Carpet from Bagdad, a mostly lost 1915 film, one reel was recovered from the wreck in 1982
 Patrick Beesly, an author and historian

References
Notes

Citations

Bibliography
Books

 
 

Newspapers, journals and other media

Online

Further reading

 Trommler, Frank. "The Lusitania Effect: America's Mobilization against Germany in World War I" German Studies Review'' 32#2 (2009), pp. 241–266 online

External links

 Lest We Forget: The Lusitania – from Encyclopedia Titanica
 RMS Lusitania, Public Broadcasting Service (PBS)
 Lusitania pictures: Construction, engine, and interior photos; disaster and wreck illustrations' – BigBadBattleships.com
 Sinking of the Lusitania (1918)

 
Conflicts in 1915
Ships built on the River Clyde
Ships of Scotland
Ships sunk by German submarines in World War I
World War I shipwrecks in the Atlantic Ocean
Blue Riband holders
Passenger ships of the United Kingdom
Four funnel liners
1906 ships
Shipwrecks of Ireland
Maritime incidents in Ireland
Maritime incidents in 1915
Conspiracy theories